The Monplaisir Palace is part of the Peterhof Palace Complex, Russia.

See also
 Monplaisir Garden

References

Palaces in Petergof
Cultural heritage monuments of federal significance in Saint Petersburg